The Interliber - International Book and Teaching Appliances Fair is the largest Croatian trade fair for books and teaching appliances.

It is held annually in mid-November at the Zagreb Fair grounds in Zagreb, Croatia.

Representatives from book publishing and multimedia companies from all over the world come to the Interliber in order to present their products to the general public.

References

Book fairs in Croatia
November events
Tourist attractions in Zagreb
Recurring events established in 1977
Culture in Zagreb
1977 establishments in Yugoslavia
Autumn events in Croatia
Festivals in Yugoslavia